The SAS SNDP Yogam College (SAS SNDP Yogam College) is the first college in Konni, Kerala, India. It was started by the Sree Narayana Dharma Paripalana Yogam (SNDP), in 1995. Resolved to establish a college at Konni in Memorial obeisance to the great philosopher and social reformer, Sahodaran Ayyappan, an ardent disciple of Sree Narayana Guru to provide better, higher educational facilities mainly for the backward classes of the region.

History
The college began to function in July 1995 with affiliation to the MG University  with three courses at the undergraduate level. The college was elevated to the status of a Post Graduate Institution in 2001 with introduction of M.Sc. course Computer Science.

The college started with rented premises in Konni and later moved to own premises in Attachackal. The college finally shifted base to permanent structures at Cherimukku, KONNI.

Colleges in Kerala
Colleges affiliated to Mahatma Gandhi University, Kerala
Universities and colleges in Pathanamthitta district
Educational institutions established in 1995
1995 establishments in Kerala